John Hunt (fl. 1383–1421) was a tailor and citizen of the town of Reading in the English county of Berkshire. He held the office of Mayor of Reading in 1404–5, 1407–8, 1418–19 and 1422–3. He was a Member (MP) of the Parliament of England for Reading in 1383, 1399,
1406 and 1421, although it is possible that it was his brother, a butcher also known as John Hunt, who had sat in the Parliaments of 1383 and 1399.

References

Year of birth missing
Year of death missing
English MPs October 1383
English MPs 1399
People from Reading, Berkshire
Mayors of Reading, Berkshire
Members of the Parliament of England (pre-1707) for Reading
English MPs 1406
English MPs May 1421